Sand Hills is an unincorporated community in Bay County, Florida, United States. It is located along the north side of North Bay and north of Southport. The main roads through the community are State Road 20 and State Road 77. It is also part of the Panama City–Lynn Haven–Panama City Beach Metropolitan Statistical Area.
 The area was sanctioned as a "community" and was officially plotted out under the leadership of Ben Baker.

References

Recognition of Sand Hills, FL

Former census-designated places in Bay County, Florida
Unincorporated communities in Bay County, Florida
Unincorporated communities in Florida